The following lists events that happened during 1982 in Laos.

Incumbents
President: Souphanouvong 
Prime Minister: Kaysone Phomvihane

Events

Births
18 November - Sikhounxay Ounkhamphanyavong, swimmer

References

 
Years of the 20th century in Laos
1980s in Laos
Laos